The Black Hand (French: La main noire, Italian: La mano nera) is a 1968 French-Italian crime thriller film directed by Max Pécas and starring Janine Reynaud, Chantal Nobel and Jean Topart.

Cast
 James Harris  as Thomas Varga 
 Janine Reynaud as Mafalda 
 Anny Nelsen as Albane 
 Chantal Nobel as Éléonore 
 Jean Topart as Zanror 
 Pierre Tissot as Un membre de la Main Noire 
 Luigi Cortese as Un homme de main 
 Claude Salez as Un membre de la Main Noire 
 Michel Charrel as Llasan 
 Alfred Baillou as Le nain 
 Doris Thomas as Vivian Ray 
 Jean Franval as Le garagiste 
 Colette Régis as La gouvernante 
 Jacques Bernard as Ferenzari 
 Rico Lopez as Un homme de main

References

Bibliography 
 Alfred Krawc. International Directory of Cinematographers, Set- and Costume Designers in Film: France (from the beginnings to 1980). Saur, 1983.

External links 
 

1968 films
Italian crime thriller films
French crime thriller films
1960s crime thriller films
1960s French-language films
Films directed by Max Pécas
1960s French films
1960s Italian films